2015 Tunisia attack may refer to:

Bardo National Museum attack in March
2015 Tunis barracks shooting in May
2015 Sousse attacks in June
2015 Tunis bombing in November